In mathematics, a graph C*-algebra is a universal C*-algebra constructed from a directed graph. Graph C*-algebras are direct generalizations of the Cuntz algebras and Cuntz-Krieger algebras, but the class of graph C*-algebras has been shown to also include several other widely studied classes of C*-algebras.  As a result, graph C*-algebras provide a common framework for investigating many well-known classes of C*-algebras that were previously studied independently.  Among other benefits, this provides a context in which one can formulate theorems that apply simultaneously to all of these subclasses and contain specific results for each subclass as special cases.

Although graph C*-algebras include numerous examples, they provide a class of C*-algebras that are surprisingly amenable to study and much more manageable than general C*-algebras.  The graph not only determines the associated C*-algebra by specifying relations for generators, it also provides a useful tool for describing and visualizing properties of the C*-algebra.  This visual quality has led to graph C*-algebras being referred to as "operator algebras we can see."  Another advantage of graph C*-algebras is that much of their structure and many of their invariants can be readily computed.  Using data coming from the graph, one can determine whether the associated C*-algebra has particular properties, describe the lattice of ideals, and compute K-theoretic invariants.

Graph terminology
The terminology for graphs used by C*-algebraists differs slightly from that used by graph theorists. The term graph is typically taken to mean a directed graph  consisting of a countable set of vertices , a countable set of edges , and maps  identifying the range and source of each edge, respectively. A vertex is called a singular vertex if it is either a sink or an infinite emitter, and a vertex is called a regular vertex if it is not a singular vertex. A graph is called row-finite if it has no infinite emitters; i.e., if every vertex is either a regular vertex or a sink.

A cycle  is called a simple cycle if  for all .

The following are two important graph conditions that arise in the study of graph C*-algebras.

Condition (L):  Every cycle in the graph has an exit.

Condition (K): There is no vertex in the graph that is on exactly one simple cycle.  That is, a graph satisfies Condition (K) if and only if each vertex in the graph is either on no cycles or on two or more simple cycles.

The Cuntz-Krieger Relations and the universal property

 (CK1)  for all ,
 (CK2)  whenever  is a regular vertex, and
 (CK3)  for all .

Edge Direction Convention
It is important to be aware that there are competing conventions regarding the "direction of the edges" in the Cuntz-Krieger relations.  Throughout this article, and in the way that the relations are stated above, we use the convention first established in the seminal papers on graph C*-algebras.  The alternate convention, which is used in Raeburn's CBMS book on Graph Algebras, interchanges the roles of the range map  and the source map  in the Cuntz-Krieger relations.  The effect of this change is that the C*-algebra of a graph for one convention is equal to the C*-algebra of the graph with the edges reversed when using the other convention.

Row-Finite Graphs
In the Cuntz-Krieger relations, (CK2) is imposed only on regular vertices. The fact that the Cuntz-Krieger relations take a simpler form for row-finite graphs has technical consequences for many results in the subject. Not only are results easier to prove in the row-finite case, but also the statements of theorems are simplified when describing C*-algebras of row-finite graphs. Historically, much of the early work on graph C*-algebras was done exclusively in the row-finite case. Even in modern work, where infinite emitters are allowed and C*-algebras of general graphs are considered, it is common to state the row-finite case of a theorem separately or as a corollary, since results are often more intuitive and transparent in this situation.

Examples
The graph C*-algebra has been computed for many graphs.  Conversely, for certain classes of C*-algebras it has been shown how to construct a graph whose C*-algebra is -isomorphic or Morita equivalent to a given C*-algebra of that class.

The following table shows a number of directed graphs and their C*-algebras.  We use the convention that a double arrow drawn from one vertex to another and labeled  indicates that there are a countably infinite number of edges from the first vertex to the second.

The class of graph C*-algebras has been shown to contain various classes of C*-algebras.  The C*-algebras in each of the following classes may be realized as graph C*-algebras up to :

 Cuntz algebras
 Cuntz-Krieger algebras
 finite-dimensional C*-algebras
 stable AF algebras

The C*-algebras in each of the following classes may be realized as graph C*-algebras up to Morita equivalence:

 AF algebras 
 Kirchberg algebras with free K1-group

Correspondence between graph and C*-algebraic properties
Indeed, much of the study of graph C*-algebras is concerned with developing a lexicon for the correspondence between these properties, and establishing theorems of the form "The graph  has a certain graph-theoretic property if and only if the C*-algebra  has a corresponding  property." The following table provides a short list of some of the more well-known equivalences.

The gauge action
This yields a strongly continuous action  by defining . It is important to note that the canonical gauge action depends on the choice of the generating Cuntz-Krieger -family . It appears in statements of theorems, and it is also used behind the scenes as a technical device in proofs.

The uniqueness theorems
There are two well-known uniqueness theorems for graph C*-algebras: the gauge-invariant uniqueness theorem and the Cuntz-Krieger uniqueness theorem. The uniqueness theorems are fundamental results in the study of graph C*-algebras, and they serve as cornerstones of the theory. Consequently, the uniqueness theorems can be used to determine when a C*-algebra generated by a Cuntz-Krieger -family is 
Formal statements of the uniqueness theorems are as follows:

The Gauge-Invariant Uniqueness Theorem:  Let  be a graph, and let  be the associated graph C*-algebra.

  for all ,

then  is injective.

The Cuntz-Krieger Uniqueness Theorem:  Let  be a graph satisfying Condition (L), and let  be the associated graph C*-algebra.

Ideal structure
A subset of vertices  is called hereditary if for all ,  implies .

For any saturated hereditary subset , the ideal  is gauge invariant.

The following theorem shows that gauge-invariant ideals correspond to saturated hereditary subsets.

Theorem:  Let  be a row-finite graph.  Then the following hold:

Desingularization

The Drinen-Tomforde Desingularization, often simply called desingularization, is a technique used to extend results for C*-algebras of row-finite graphs to C*-algebras of countable graphs.

Here are some examples of this construction.  For the first example, note that if  is the graph

then a desingularization  is given by the graph

For the second example, suppose  is the  graph with one vertex and a countably infinite number of edges (each beginning and ending at this vertex).  Then a desingularization  is given by the graph

Desingularization has become a standard tool in the theory of graph C*-algebras,  and it can simplify proofs of results by allowing one to first prove the result in the (typically much easier) row-finite case, and then extend the result to countable graphs via desingularization, often with little additional effort.  

The technique of desingularization may not work for graphs containing a vertex that emits an uncountable number of edges.  However, in the study of C*-algebras it is common to restrict attention to separable C*-algebras.  Since a graph C*-algebra  is separable precisely when the graph  is countable, much of the theory of graph C*-algebras has focused on countable graphs.

K-theory
The K-groups of a graph C*-algebra may be computed entirely in terms of information coming from the graph. (In fact, this is where the term "row-finite" comes from.) Consequently, each column of the transpose  contains only finitely many nonzero entries, and we obtain a map  given by left multiplication. Likewise, if  denotes the  identity matrix, then  provides a map given by left multiplication.

Then 
 
gives a well-defined map by left multiplication.  Furthermore, 
  

Since  is isomorphic to a subgroup of the free group , we may conclude that  is a free group.  It can be shown that in the general case (i.e., when  is allowed to contain sinks or infinite emitters) that  remains a free group.  This allows one to produce examples of C*-algebras that are not graph C*-algebras: Any C*-algebra with a non-free K1-group is not Morita equivalent (and hence not isomorphic) to a graph C*-algebra.

Notes

C*-algebras